The South Carolina Gamecocks men's soccer team represents the University of South Carolina and, as of the upcoming 2022 college soccer season, competes in the Sun Belt Conference. The team is coached by Tony Annan, who succeeded Mark Berson as head coach after the 2020 season. Berson had been the Gamecocks' only head coach since the program's inception in 1978 and had participated in 20 NCAA Tournaments, reaching the Quarterfinals on four occasions. Since 1981, South Carolina has played its home games at Stone Stadium, which is affectionately called "The Graveyard" by South Carolina fans due to an adjoining cemetery.

Program history
South Carolina first fielded a men's soccer team in 1978 under the direction of current coach Mark Berson. The program wasted little time making a name for itself on the national stage, as it reached the NCAA Quarterfinals in 1985. The 14-year period from 1985 to 1998 was a dominant era for South Carolina, as it posted a 213–61–22 overall record with 12 NCAA Tournament appearances. Of the 12 NCAA Tournament trips during this run, the Gamecocks advanced to the second round or beyond on nine occasions.

Throughout its history, South Carolina has made 22 NCAA Tournaments, with four Quarterfinal appearances, two Semi-final appearances, and a 1993 National Runner-up finish. The 1993 squad won 16 contests before falling to Virginia 2–0 in the National Title game. The Gamecocks' most recent NCAA Tournament appearance came in 2016. Since the SEC does not sponsor NCAA Men's Soccer, South Carolina has participated as an Independent (even in its original years in the Metro Conference), finally joining the Metro for men's soccer in 1993 and 1994, but was forced back to independent status following the 1995 reunification with the Great Midwest Conference to form Conference USA (C-USA) until 2005, when Kentucky left the Mid-American Conference in order to allow the two SEC schools to play in C-USA together. South Carolina and Kentucky continued to play in C-USA through the 2021 season, after which both left to join the revived men's soccer league of the Sun Belt Conference.

In terms of conference championships, South Carolina won the Metro Conference season title in 1993 and the Conference USA tournament in 2005 and 2010, along with its regular season title in 2011.

Head coaches

Year-by-year results

Championships
Metro Conference: 1993
Conference USA: 2005, 2010, 2011

Records

All-Time career leaders

Scoring

Goalkeeping

Single season records
Points:  53, Clint Mathis-1995
Goals:  25, Clint Mathis-1995
Assists: 16, Rubén Tufiño-1989
GAA: 0.49, Charles Arndt-1987
Shutouts:  13, Warren Lipka – 1985

Notable former players

Current professionals
 Joshua Alcala – Free Agent
 Bradlee Baladez – FC Dallas
 Blake Brettschneider – Rochester Rhinos
 Brad Guzan – Atlanta United, United States men's national soccer team
 Tim Hankinson – Head coach of Indy Eleven
 Makan Hislop – United Petrotrin, Trinidad and Tobago national football team
 Jimmy Maurer – New York Cosmos
 Janny Rivera – Atlanta Silverbacks
 Jack Cummings - Cleveland City
 Tyler Ruthven – Miami FC
 Joey Worthen – Head coach of Florida Atlantic Men's Soccer Team
 Braeden Troyer – Richmond Kickers

Retired professionals
 Clint Mathis – Los Angeles Galaxy, New York Red Bulls, Hannover 96, Colorado Rapids, Ergotelis, Real Salt Lake; Former member of US National Team
 Josh Wolff – Sporting Kansas City, 1860 Munich, D.C. United; Former member of US National Team
 Eric Hawkes – Played 5 Seasons for Maryland Bays in the ASL & APSL National Champions.
 Doug Allison – Played 5 seasons in the NPSL; Current Furman men's soccer coach
 Paul Turin – Played for the Tulsa Roughnecks of the NASL
 Henry Ring – Chicago Fire
 Clark Brisson – Charleston Battery
 Rob Smith – Columbus Crew
 Rubén Tufiño – Played in Liga de Fútbol Profesional Boliviano, most notably with Blooming and Bolivar; earned 35 caps for Bolivia National Team
 Mike Gosselin – earned one cap for US National Team
 Billy Clifford – played three seasons for the Jacksonville Cyclones
 Ray Vigliotti – Played for the Miami Americans of the ASL; played for the New York Arrows, Tampa Bay Rowdies, Baltimore Blast, and Wichita Wings of the Major Indoor Soccer League
 Richard Wurdack – Played for the Denver Avalanche and Kansas City Comets of the Major Indoor Soccer League
 Warren Lipka – Played for the Fort Wayne Flames, Indiana Kick, and the Detroit Rockers of the American Indoor Soccer Association
 Scott Cook – Played for the Maryland Bays of the American Professional Soccer League
 Charles Arndt – Played for the Maryland Bays of the ASL

In other fields
 Jim Sonefeld – Went on to become drummer for Hootie & the Blowfish.

Footnotes

References

External links

 

 
Soccer clubs in South Carolina
1978 establishments in South Carolina
Association football clubs established in 1978